Dhuan is a 1981 Hindi-language thriller film, produced by Gautham Guha under the Sri Sai Chitra banner and directed by Dulal Guha. It stars Mithun Chakraborty, Ranjeeta, Raakhee, Amjad Khan and Jeetendra in a guest appearance and music composed by R. D. Burman. It is a remake of the English-language film Chase a Crooked Shadow (1958) and remade in Telugu as Mayadari Maridi (1985).
The same plot was later used in the 1989 movie Khoj starring Rishi Kapoor and Kimi Katkar.

Plot
The film begins at a Devigarh estate owned by Rani Gayatri Saxena. To usurp her wealth, Sunil Verma a daredevil gangster is appointed by his Boss to purport as her brother-in-law Ashok Saxena who died recently in Manila. Since Gayatri only knows Ashok on sight Sunil succeeds in forging the pieces of evidence. Gayatri tries to prove him false but fails. Eventually, she calls Sheela finance’ of Ashok and she too accepts Sunil as Ashok because the black hats endangered her father. In this process, Sheela falls for Sunil by his virtue. Gayatri gets devastated. Sunil creates her as mentally deranged. Ultimately, Gayatri declares herself as the homicide of Ashok. Stunningly, Sunil turns into a CBI officer and his boss is IG of the secret service Dinesh Dikshit. Indeed, Ashok is an Interpol officer who holds secret documents regarding the country's security for which he has been murdered. All these plays are made by Sunil to safeguard them. At last, documents are retrieved and Gayatri is apprehended. Finally, the movie ends with Sunil proceeding further along with Sheela.

Cast
Raakhee as Rani Gayatri Saxena
Mithun Chakraborty as Sunil Verma
Ranjeeta as Sheela
Amjad Khan as I.G. Dinesh Dikshit
Aruna Irani as Pushpa
Padma Khanna as Sundari
Lakshmi as Laxmi
Jeetendra as Ashok Saxena (Guest Appearance)
Abhi Bhattacharya as Sheela's Father
Goga Kapoor as Police Commissioner
Sudhir Pandey as Inspector Pandey at Devigarh Police Station
Asit Sen as Hari Singh Hawaldaar at Devigarh Police Station

Soundtrack
Lyrics: Majrooh Sultanpuri

References

External links
 

1981 films
1980s Hindi-language films
Films scored by R. D. Burman
Indian remakes of British films
Indian mystery thriller films
1981 action thriller films